was a Japanese woodblock artist associated with the sōsaku-hanga (creative prints) movement. His style was strongly influenced by Expressionism.

Fujimori was born in 1891 in Kurume, Fukuoka prefecture. He studied Western-style art (yōga)  with the Hakuba-kai ("White Horse Society") in 1910, and the next year enrolled in the Tokyo School of Fine Arts from where he graduated in 1916. At the school he met Onchi Kōshirō with whom he collaborated on Tsukuhae ("Moonglow"), a print and poetry magazine, producing 37 prints.

In 1919 he contributed to the first exhibition of the Japan Creative Print Association (Nihon Sosaku-Hanga Kyokai). After a period teaching in Fukoka and Taiwan, in 1922 he moved to Tokyo to pursue a career as a professional artist in the fields of painting, printmaking and illustration. He worked as editor of Shi to hanga, was a contributor to many other publications, and was a founding member of the Nihon Hanga Kyōkai in 1931.

He provided thirteen prints for the seminal sōsaku hanga series One Hundred Views of New Tokyo (Shin Tokyo hyakkei) of 1929–32, and produced his own series, Twelve Views of Great Tokyo (Dai Tokyo Junikei), in 1933–34.

His bold and simple expressionistic carving style may have derived from the loss of his right thumb in an accident in his youth.

Gallery

References

External links
 
 Fujimori Shizuo (1891–1943) The Lavenberg Collection of Japanese Prints

1891 births
1943 deaths
Japanese printmakers
Sosaku hanga artists